Heliconius doris, the Doris longwing or Doris is a species of butterfly in the family Nymphalidae. It is known for being a polymorphic species which participates in various Müllerian mimicry rings throughout Central America and the Amazon rainforest. It is a species of special interest in biological science for the genetic basis and role of polymorphism (biology) in ecology and evolution.

It is commonly found from sea level to 1200 metres in forest clearings.

The larvae primarily feed on granadilla species. Adults feed on nectar from Lantana flowers, with the females also collecting pollen from Psiguria and Psychotia flowers.

Subspecies
Listed alphabetically:
Heliconius doris delila (Hübner, [1813]) – (Peru)
Heliconius doris dives (Oberthür, 1920) – (Colombia, Venezuela)
Heliconius doris doris (Linnaeus, 1771) – (Surinam, French Guiana, Guyana, Colombia, Bolivia, Peru, Brazil)
Heliconius doris obscurus (Weymer, 1891) – (Colombia, Ecuador)
?Heliconius doris virescens Riffarth, 1901
Heliconius doris viridis (Staudinger, 1885) – (Panama, Honduras)
Heliconus doris morralli (Cast, 2019) – (Trinidad)

References

External links

Species info, Tree of Life web project

Heliconius
Fauna of Brazil
Nymphalidae of South America
Butterflies described in 1771
Taxa named by Carl Linnaeus